Rodrigo Marques de Santana (born 29 May 1982), known as Rodrigo Santana, is a Brazilian football manager for Liga 1 club RANS Nusantara and former player who played as an attacking midfielder.

Career
Born in Santos, São Paulo, Santana played as a midfielder and retired in 2010, aged 28, after suffering a hand injury while representing Confiança. He started his career as Camboriú's assistant, being named manager shortly after.

In 2011, Santana was named manager of Pinheiros' under-20 manager, being in charge of the first team afterwards. He left the club in November, being immediately appointed Nenê Belarmino's assistant at Uberaba.

On 14 February 2012, Santana left Uberaba and was named Portuguesa Santista manager. Late in the year, he was also in charge of União Suzano during a trip in Bolivia.

In 2013, Santana was Grêmio Barueri's assistant during the Campeonato Paulista Série A2. On 5 November of that year, he was presented as manager of the under-20 squad of São Carlos for the ensuing Copa São Paulo de Futebol Júnior; the following 8 February, he replaced fired Roberto Oliveira as manager of the main squad, acting as an interim until the end of the competition and suffering relegation.

On 10 June 2014, Santana left São Carlos and was appointed manager of Juventus the following day. He was sacked on 11 March 2016, after achieving promotion to the second division of Paulistão the previous year.

On 15 April 2016, Santana returned to Uberaba and was named manager of the main squad. On 26 October, he was named at the helm of URT.

On 20 July 2018, Santana signed for Atlético Mineiro as a coordinator of the youth division. On 4 October 2018, he was named manager of the under-20s. On 12 April 2019, he was appointed interim first team manager after the dismissal of Levir Culpi, and on 24 June, he was named permanent manager.

On 13 October 2019, Santana was sacked after a defeat to Grêmio. On 16 February 2020, he took over Avaí in the place of sacked Augusto Inácio, but was himself dismissed on 1 August.

On 29 October 2020, Santana replaced fired Jorginho at the helm of Coritiba in the top tier. He was himself dismissed on 13 December, after winning only two points out of 15.

On 12 May 2021, Santana was named manager of Confiança in the Série B, but was sacked on 26 July after the club was in the last position.

On 5 December 2022, Santana was briefly announced as one the new assistant coaches for Corinthians 2023 season. However on the next day, the signing was cancelled due to Santana being linked to anti-democratic acts related to the 2022 Brazilian general election.

Managerial statistics

References

External links

1982 births
Living people
Brazilian footballers
Association football midfielders
América Futebol Clube (RN) players
Associação Desportiva Confiança players
Brazilian football managers
Campeonato Brasileiro Série A managers
Associação Atlética Portuguesa (Santos) managers
Grêmio Barueri Futebol managers
São Carlos Futebol Clube managers
Clube Atlético Juventus managers
Uberaba Sport Club managers
União Recreativa dos Trabalhadores managers
Clube Atlético Mineiro managers
Avaí FC managers
Coritiba Foot Ball Club managers
Associação Desportiva Confiança managers
Sportspeople from Santos, São Paulo